Devendra Swarup (1926 – 14 January 2019) was an Indian writer, journalist and RSS ideologue, who was awarded the Padma Shri, the fourth highest civilian award in India posthumously in 2019.

Death  
Devendra Swarup died on 14 January 2019, at the age of 93.

See also 

List of Padma Shri award recipients (2010–2019)

References

External links 

Indian writers
Recipients of the Padma Shri in literature & education
1926 births
2019 deaths
Rashtriya Swayamsevak Sangh pracharaks
Hindi-language writers
Indian journalists
People from Moradabad
People from Uttar Pradesh